Stéphane Azambre (born 30 June 1969 in Grenoble) was a French cross-country skier who competed from 1992 to 1996. Competing in two Winter Olympics, he earned his best overall and individual finishes at Albertville in 1992 by finishing eighth in the 4 x 10 km relay and 26th in the 50 km event, respectively.

Azambre's best finish at the FIS Nordic World Ski Championships was 21st twice (1993: 10 km + 15 km combined pursuit, 1995: 50 km). His best World Cup finish was seventh in a 15 km event in Italy in 1992.

Azambre's lone career victory was in a 10 km Continental Cup event in Italy in 1997.

External links

Olympic 4 x 10 km relay results: 1936-2002 

1969 births
Living people
Cross-country skiers at the 1992 Winter Olympics
Cross-country skiers at the 1994 Winter Olympics
French male cross-country skiers
Olympic cross-country skiers of France
Sportspeople from Grenoble
20th-century French people
21st-century French people